Endre Kálmán Bajcsy-Zsilinszky (Szarvas, June 6, 1886 – Sopronkőhida, December 24, 1944), was an influential Hungarian national radical politician and an important voice in the struggle against German expansion and military policy. Executed National Resistant by the Hungarist Arrow Cross Party.

Family history
The Zsilinszky name first appeared in 1720, in the registry of the Evangelical church (Lutheran Church) of Békéscsaba, where his great grandfather, Mihály Zsilinszky, a well off peasant farmer and an elected judge of Slovak origin, lived.

Endre's grandfather (born in 1838), and his father Dr. Endre Zsilinszky, were also born in Békéscsaba. In 1883, his father married Mária Bajcsy, the stepdaughter of János Vilim, a lawyer related to the Zsilinszky family. The young couple initially resided in Szarvas and the marriage produced four children; Endre, Gábor, Margit and Erzsébet and on June 6, 1886 he was christened Endre Kálmán in the local Lutheran Church.

Youth and Education
Endre was a year old when his family moved from Szarvas to Békéscsaba, and he studied at the Gyula Andrássy High School, where, by academic excellence he rose above his peers. He regularly participated in the school's activities and chaired its self-improvement club. His prize winning compositions drew attention, and revealed his grasp of the social issues of the day. He excelled in each subject (Hungarian, Latin, Greek, German), and graduated with honours. This gained him a scholarship grant from the Lutheran Church diocese of Bánya.

After high school graduation in 1904, he continued his university education at the Faculty of Law of the Franz Joseph University in Kolozsvár (Cluj-Napoca).

His multifaceted abilities exhibited themselves in his first year of university. He read a lot of Széchenyi's works, and in addition to his law studies, he also signed up to study history of philosophy. His second year in school brought him a lot of exciting experiences and intellectual enrichment. He ended up spending two semesters at the universities of Leipzig and Heidelberg. During his sojourn in Germany, his interests increasingly focused on the world of politics. The developing political situation in Germany increased his incentive to study with greater diligence. And yet, in spite of his commitment to his studies, there was time for self-improvement. During his stay in Heidelberg, he developed numerous friendships and social contacts, which required him to extensively socialize.

On April 24, 1908 he completed his political science studies, and on December 5, he received his doctorate in law. In the autumn of 1909 he enlisted in the 1st Imperial and Royal Hussars in Vienna as a volunteer, and in September 1910, he received his reserve officer's commission.

At this time, through a conflict by his Békéscsaba family, András L. Áchim, one of the founders of the Hungarian Peasants party, was shot to death by Endre's brother, Gábor Zsilinszky.

Career
Following these events, from October 1910 on, he worked as a junior law clerk, established friendships, and improved his social life. He lectured in political citizens' circles and contributed articles to the Women's circle. In February 1912, he entered public life and found employment as the apprentice steward of Alsókubin in the comitatus (county) of Árva.

World War I
Immediately after the outbreak of World War I, Bajcsy-Zsilinszky volunteered for front-line duty and his unit, part of the II. Mounted (Hussar) Division, was deployed to the Serbian front.

Afterwards he was deployed to the Italian front, and at the beginning of June 1916, as part of the 2nd Imperial and Royal Mounted Hussars' Marksmen Division, he was deployed on the Eastern front.

In September of the same year he was wounded, and spent a slow and lingering period of recuperation at the military hospital. At the beginning of 1917, he requested and was granted permission to return to the front.

In 1918, he participated in the founding of the Hungarian National Defense Association (Magyar Országos Véderő Egylet) (MOVE), for which, later, he was forced to emigrate to Vienna.

Between World Wars
After his return to Hungary, he settled in Szeged. His support was welcomed by the nationalists, and the populist political party of Gyula Gömbös. Under his editorial guidance, among others, the Voice (Szózat), a newspaper with nationalist and racist themes, was published.

Elected to the Parliament as a representative of the Unity Party in 1922. In 1923 he defected, with Gyula Gömbös, to form the Hungarian National Independence Party, better known as the Guardians of Race Party (Fajvédő Párt). Voice (Szózat) became the party's official organ. In 1925 he was honoured with the commission of Valiant knight (Vitéz). In 1926, he became the editor-in-chief of the Hungarians (Magyarság), and in 1928 he became the editor-in-chief of the Forward guard (Előörs) newspaper, which also marked the gradual distancing from the political camp of Gyula Gömbös.

In 1930, he founded the National Radical Party (Nemzeti Radikális Párt) and in 1932, he became the editor-in-chief of the anti-Nazi daily Freedom (Szabadság). His political stature grew in 1935 when his party and political allies were elected to the Hungarian Parliament. In the same year, he resigned his Vitéz commission.

World War II
After the outbreak of World War II, he became the editor-in-chief of the weekly paper Independent Hungary (Független Magyarország) in which he espoused the necessity of blocking German expansion (Living space (Lebensraum)), through the united efforts of the small states bordering along the Danube.

From 1941, he was the editor of the anti-Nazi paper The Free Word (Szabad Szó), and in the same year, he was one of the major organizers of the March 15 anti-Nazi protests.

On March 19, 1944, Bajcsy-Zsilinszky, at his residence, fought with a weapon to prevent arrest by the Gestapo. He was wounded in the brief gun battle, arrested, and hauled away.

On October 11 of the same year, his release was demanded and obtained by the Hungarian government. But, in November, he was again arrested and incarcerated in the Sopronköhida prison, where he was executed by hanging on December 23. On May 27, 1945, he was reburied in Tarpa with honours.

In Memoriam
Due to his anti-Nazi stance, he was honoured by the government of the post-war Hungarian People's Republic, and his nationalist and anti-Nazi theories still have adherents.

Streets named after him in Baja, Balassagyarmat, Balatonalmádi, Budapest, Debrecen, Győr, Eger, Esztergom, Kaposvár, Kecskemét, Kiskunfélegyháza, Kiskőrös, Környe, Kőszeg, Miskolc, Pécs, Szentes, Tokaj and in the inner city of Tatabánya. Also, the city of Novi Sad (Serbia) named a street after him in gratitude for raising his voice in Hungarian parliament against the mass killing of Vojvodina Serbs, Jews, and Roma by Hungarian soldiers and gendarmes in 1942.

A station on the M1 line (yellow, or Millennium line) of the Budapest Metro is also named after him.

Works
 A Singular Path: The Hungarian peasant farmer (Egyetlen út: A Magyar Paraszt)
 National Rebirth and the Press (Nemzeti újjászületés és sajtó)
 New Year's Open Letter to the Electorate of the Derecske Electoral District (Újévi nyílt levele a derecskei választókerület polgáraihoz)
 National Radicalism (Nemzeti radikalizmus)
 German World in Hungary (Német világ Magyarországon)
 King Matthias (Mátyás király)
 Our Place and Fate in Europe (Helyünk és sorsunk Európában)
 Transylvania: Past and Future (Erdély, a Mult és a Jövö)

References

Sources
 Károly Vigh: Endre Bajcsy-Zsilinszky (1886–1944)- A Man With A Mission. Published by (Szépirodalmi Könyvkiadó, Budapest, 1992) . (Vigh Károly: Bajcsy-Zsilinszky Endre (1886–1944) / A küldetéses ember (Szépirodalmi Könyvkiadó, Budapest, 1992) )
 Halász, Iván : Tzv. lojálni Slováci v dualistickom Uhorsku ("dobrí Slováci", "úradní Tóthi", uhorskí vlastenci, maďaróni a tí druhí....) In: Regionálna a národná identita v maďarskej a slovenskej histórii 18. - 20. storočia = Regionális és nemzeti identitásformák a 18 - 20. századi magyar és a szlovák történelemben. [Eds.]: Šutaj, Štefan - Szarka, László. Prešov, Universum 2007, s. 91-102. Rés. maď. s. 102-103 Az ún. lojális szlovákok a dualizmuskori Magyarországon ("jó szlovákok", "hivatalos tórok", magyarországi hazafiak, maďarónok és a többiek...); angl. s. 103 So-called loyal Slovak in Hungary during the Dual Monarchy ("Good Slovaks", "Official Tots", Hungarian patriots, "Magyarized Slovaks", and others...)

External links
His statue in Elizabeth park in Budapest
Biographical Encyclopedia of Hungary

1886 births
1944 deaths
People from Szarvas
Hungarian Lutherans
Independent Smallholders, Agrarian Workers and Civic Party politicians
Austro-Hungarian military personnel of World War I
Franz Joseph University alumni
Executed politicians
Executed Hungarian people
People executed by Nazi Germany by hanging
Hungarian resistance movement of World War II
Hungarian resistance members
20th-century Lutherans
Hungarian people of Slovak descent